Whitecourt Healthcare Centre is a medical facility located in Whitecourt, Alberta. Alberta Health Services is responsible for the operations of the hospital. It contains 24 beds with two special care beds and one palliative care bed. Physician staffing is provided by two local clinics as well as locum tenens. The primary referral centres for the hospital are the University of Alberta Hospital and the Royal Alexandra Hospital.

Services 
Day surgery    
Diagnostic imaging
Emergency 
Hemodialysis
Inpatient care
Laboratory
Obstetrics
Visiting specialist care

Statistics 
For the 2011–2012 year, the emergency department assessed 15,413 patients.  The visit rate is 680 visits per 1,000 people in a year, far higher than the Alberta average. The most common reason for an emergency department visit is acute upper respiratory infection with a visit rate three times that of the Alberta average. The inpatient separation rate was 99.5 per 1,000, similar to the Alberta average of 88 per 1,000. Ischemic heart disease, pneumonia and mental health were the top three reasons for inpatient separation, all higher rates than the Alberta average.

References 

Hospital buildings completed in 1966
Hospitals in Alberta
Whitecourt